All singing all dancing may refer to:

All singing, all dancing (idiom), meaning full of vitality, or full-featured
"All Singing, All Dancing", a season-nine episode of The Simpsons